The Klamath smallscale sucker (Catostomus rimiculus), also known as the Jenny Creek sucker, is a species of ray-finned fish in the family Catostomidae. It is a freshwater fish that primarily inhabits the Trinity and Klamath River watersheds, as well as the overall region of the Klamath Basin in general. Within the Klamath Basin, they inhabit the area along with three other sucker fish: the Lost River sucker, shortnose sucker, and the Klamath largescale sucker. These fish can vary in length from 35 cm to 50 cm, and usually have a lifespan of around 9-15 years. They often form mixed schools with speckled dace, sculpins, and juvenile steelhead.

A population of the species separated from the Klamath River by a waterfall are called Jenny Creek suckers.

Distribution
Klamath smallscale suckers primarily inhabits the Trinity and Klamath River watersheds. Within the Klamath River basin it is considered rare.

Genetic analyses suggest that six or fewer Klamath smallscale suckers from the Klamath River founded the population in the Smith River.

Relationship with humans
In Oregon Klamath smallscale suckers are listed as a sensitive species of concern.

The International Game Fish Association all tackle world record for the Klamath smallscale sucker stands at 2 lbs 8 oz taken from the Trinity River near Del Loma, California.

Life Cycle

Reproduction 
Klamath smallscale suckers migrate to tributary streams to reproduce in the spring. Female suckers are able to produce 15,000-20,000 eggs, which male suckers then externally fertilize. They migrate to the larger streams where they spend their adulthood.

Growth 
Jenny Creek Suckers live up to 5-6 years, while the Klamath population has a longer life expectancy up to 17 years. Both populations experience rapid growth in the first half of their lives, with Jenny Creek Suckers and Klamath smallscale suckers reaching their maximum sizes by around 3 years and 10 years, respectively. Compared to Jenny Creek Suckers that reach around 140 mm length at their maturity, Klamath suckers are significantly larger, reaching up to 400 mm in size.

Genetics 
Klamath smallscale suckers are genetically closely related to three other species of the Catostomidae family that also inhabit the Klamath River: Klamath largescale suckers, Lost River suckers, and Shortnose suckers. The four species and their eggs are highly similar in appearance, leading to frequent misclassification. Research suggests that there is hybridization occurring among the four species, the cause of which has yet to be determined.

References

External links 

 https://researcharchive.calacademy.org/research/ichthyology/types/Index.asp

Catostomus